The 1958 Cotton Bowl Classic was the 22nd edition of the college football bowl game, played at the Cotton Bowl in Dallas, Texas, on Wednesday, January 1. Part of the 1957–58 bowl game season, it matched the independent and fifth-ranked Navy Midshipmen and the #8 Rice Owls of the Southwest Conference (SWC).  Slightly favored, Navy won 20–7.

Teams

This was the only bowl game of the season that matched two top 10 teams in the final AP Poll, which was released in early December. This was the first Cotton Bowl Classic televised by CBS.

Navy

The fifth-ranked Midshipmen (8–1–1) were favored by a point. They lost early in the season at North Carolina and tied #16 Duke in November. Notable late season wins were at #5 Notre Dame (20–6) and a shutout of #10 Army (14–0). It was Navy's third appearance in a major bowl and first Cotton Bowl.

Rice

The eighth-ranked Owls (7–3) had been to three previous Cotton Bowls, two within the decade, and finished first in the Southwest Conference for the fourth time in eleven years.

Game summary
Rice never recovered after Navy led 13–0 at halftime on touchdown runs by Joe Tranchini and Harry Hurst. Team captain Ned Oldham added another early in the third quarter to give Navy a commanding 20–0 lead. Ken Williams—stepfather of pro wrestler Steve Austin—caught a touchdown pass from Frank Ryan to narrow the lead to 13, but Rice never seriously threatened from that point on.   Navy outgained Rice on ground by 222 yards to 137 as the Owls committed six turnovers.  Forrestal and Ryan both had 13 completions, which set a Cotton Bowl record.

Scoring
First quarter
Navy – Joe Tranchini 1-yard run (Roland Brandquist kick failed)
Second quarter
Navy – Harry Hurst 13-yard run (Ned Oldham kick)
Third quarter
Navy – Oldham 19-yard run (Oldham kick)
Rice – Ken Williams 8-yard pass from Frank Ryan (King Hill kick)
Fourth quarter
No scoring

Aftermath
Rice did not win another conference championship until 1994; their next bowl win was in December 2008, and they have yet to return to the Cotton Bowl.

Navy reached the Cotton Bowl six years later (with Roger Staubach at quarterback), but lost to top-ranked Texas, and have not returned.

References

External links
Cotton Bowl Classic – January 1, 1958

Cotton Bowl Classic
Cotton Bowl Classic
Navy Midshipmen football bowl games
Rice Owls football bowl games
January 1958 sports events in the United States
Cotton Bowl